Nicolas Saboly (30 January 1614 – 26 July 1675) was a French poet, composer and choirmaster. He composed many Christmas carols in the Provençal dialect which form one of the monuments of poetry in that language and have been continuously republished until the present day.

Life 
Nicolas Saboly was born on 31 January 1614 in Monteux to a family of herdsmen.
His great-grandfather Claude Saboly and his grandfather Raymond Saboly followed this occupation. 
It was  Raymond Saboly who came to settle in Monteux.
Nicolas was the youngest son of Felisa Meilheuret and Jean Saboly.
He had an older brother named Jean-Pierre Saboly and three sisters named Anne, Félicia (Felisa) and Claire.

Student destined for the priesthood 
Saboly's father died on 15 August 1619, and Nicolas entered the Jesuit college of Carpentras. 
At the end of his schooling he became a member of the Congregation of the Annunciation of the Blessed Virgin on 14 May 1628.
In the autumn of 1628 he left his college to begin taking classes at the University of Avignon. 
He received the tonsure in 1630 and attended courses in law and theology, as evidenced by two notarial acts of 12 March 1632 and 27 December 1633, which he witnessed as a student of theology. 
In 1634 he left the University without taking his degrees. 
On 27 September 1635 he was ordained a sub-deacon, deacon and priest.

Career as choirmaster 

In 1639 Nicolas Saboly obtained the position of organist and choirmaster of the Saint-Siffrein Cathedral(fr) in Carpentras.
He was occasionally employed in local festivals, such as on 22 September 1639 when the clergy of Caromb asked him to play the organ for the parish festival of St. Maurice.
He received 10 florins and 12 sous for his performance.
His name disappears from the accounts of Saint-Siffrein after 20 June 1643, when he was replaced by the choirmaster David.

Nicolas Saboly went to Arles where he was choirmaster from 1643 to 1646, then the cathedral of Aix-en-Provence from 1652 to 1655.
He was in Nîmes in 1659.
He was choirmaster of the collegiate church of Saint-Pierre d'Avignon(fr) from before 1668 until his death.

Ecclesiastical benefices 

Like many priests of his time, Saboly obtained several ecclesiastical benefits. 
On 16 April 1633  he became chaplain of St. Mary Magdalene in the Cathedral of Saint Siffrein in Carpentras.
He kept this benefice until 1663.
On 28 March 1658 he was issued a certificate of studies that found he had attended courses at the University of Avignon from 1628 to 1634, and was given a certificate of aptitude for obtaining profits in the dioceses of Nîmes and Uzès.

On 10 June 1660, after a lengthy process, he obtained a pension of 100 lt. (livre tournois) from the papal administration to take on the priory and the benefit of Saint-Benoît-de-Cayran in the diocese of Uzès.
After returning to Avignon he obtained the chaplaincy of Saint Mary, which he still held in 1663.

Testament and death 

On 21 April 1671 Saboly's will was notarized by François Julien in Marseilles.
Saboly made his niece Claire Saboly (wife of Christophe Chardenas, bourgeois of Roquemaure, Gard) ) his universal heiress. 
He also bequeathed 600 lt. to his servant Isabeau Sevique, and reserved from his niece's legacy an annuity with 600 lt. of capital yielding 30 lt. annually to be paid to the chapter of Saint-Pierre d'Avignon so that after his death two masses would be said each week in his memory. 
He died four years later on 25 July 1675 in Avignon.
He is buried in the choir of the Saint-Pierre church.

Saboly's career as a choirmaster was standard for this period. 
He is famous for the carols that he composed.

Works

Manuscript works

Bastide collection. Manuscript collection of 220 carols with music notes, in Provencal and French, compiled and written by Joseph Bastide, surgeon from Avignon, at the beginning of the 18th century. In-4 °, 500 p. Contains almost all of Saboly's compositions except for numbers 6, 11, 34, 49, 62, 64, 67.
Carpentras BM: Ms. 384. Collection of French and Provencal poetry, 17th  century. 4 °, 144 f. This collection contains pieces by Saboly and has been entirely attributed to him, wrongly. See the discussion of authenticity in Faury 1876, Part 2.
Two polyphonic masses in the manuscript Carpentras BM: Ms. 1267, probably written during his post at Saint-Siffrein;
Two motets

Printed works

First editions in fascicle

The first editions of Saboly's carols consist of eight bound instalments, dated between 1668 and 1674, kept in Paris Ars. : BL 9478. The titles of the instalments are:

 Lei Noé de San Pierre. Avignon : Pierre Offray, 1668. 12°.
 Lei Noé de San Pierre. Avignon : Pierre Offray, 1669. 12° read online.
 Lei Noé de San Pierre. De l'année 1669. Avignon : 1669. 12° read online.
 Histori de la naissenso dou fis de Diou, composado en Noé, per N. Saboly... Avignon : 1670. 12° read online.
 Noés nouveous de l'an M.DC.LXXI. Composas per Nicolas Saboly... Avignon : Michel Chastel, 1671. 12°, 16 p. read online.
 Noés nouveous de l'an M.DC.LXXII. Composas per... Avignon : 1672. 12°, 16 p.
 Noés nouveous de l'an M. DC.LXXIII... Avignon : 1673. 12°, 16 p.
 Noés nouveous de l'an M. DC.LXXIV... Avignon : 1674. 12°, 16 p.

Editions collected in one volume

 Recueil des noëls provenceaux composez par le sieur Nicolas Saboly. Avignon : Michel Chastel, 1699. 12°, 100 p. Paris BNF : YE-12578.
 Recueil des noëls provenceaux composez par le sieur Nicolas Saboly Avignon : F. Mallard et F. Domergue, 1724. 2e éd. 12°, 100 p. Paris BNF.
 Recueil des noëls provenceaux composez par le sieur Nicolas Saboly... Avignon : J. Molière, 1737. 3e éd. 12°, 99 p. Paris BNF. Online on Gallica.
  Recueil des noëls provenceaux composé par le sr Nicolas Saboly,... Nouvelle édition, augmentée du Noël fait à la mémoire de M. Saboly, et de celui des Rois, fait par J.-F. D*** [Joseph-François Domergue]. Avignon : impr. de F.-J. Domergue, 1763. 12°, 112 p.
 Idem. Avignon : T. F. Domergue le jeune, 1772. 12°, 114 p.
 Idem. Avignon : J. T. Domergue, 1774. 12°, 120 p.
 Recueil de Noëls provençaux composés par le sieur Nicolas Saboly. Avignon : Jean Chaillot, 1791. 12°.
 Recueil de noëls provençaux, composés par le sieur Nicolas Saboly... Nouvelle édition, augmentée du noël fait à la mémoire de M. Saboly, & de celui des Rois, fait par J. F. Domergue, doyen d’Aramon. Carpentras : Gaudibert-Penne, 1803. 12°, 120 p.
 Idem. Avignon : Jean Chaillot, 1804. 12°, 132 p.
 Idem. Avignon : Jean Chaillot, 1807. 12°, 132 p.
 Idem. Avignon : Chaillot Aîné, 1820. 12°, 132 p.
 Idem. Avignon : Chaillot aîné, 1824. 12°, 132 p. Online on Google Books.
 Idem. Avignon : Offray aîné, 1854. 12°, 132 p.
 Idem. Avignon : Peyri, 1854. 12°, 132 p. Online on Google Books.
 Recueil des Noels composés en langue provençale... Nouvelle édition... publiée pour la première fois avec les airs notés... par Fr. Seguin. Avignon : Fr. Seguin aîné, 1856. Partition 2°, L-87 p., mus. Online on Gallica. Édition réimprimée en 1897.
 Nouvè de Micolau Saboly avec une préface de Frédéric Mistral. Avignon : Aubanel frères, 1865.
 Vint-un Nouvè causi de Micolau Saboly (1614-1675), édition du Tricentenaire présentée par Pierre Fabre et Robert Allan, publication de l'Institut vauclusien d'études rhodaniennes. Vedène : Comptoir général du livre occitan, 1975.
  Li Nouvè di Rèire de Nicolas Saboly. Berre L'Etang : C.I.E.L d'Oc, s.d. Disponible en en PDF.
 Recueil des Noëls provençaux, Lou Reviro-meinage, Œuvres complètes de Nicolas Saboly, présentation, traduction, notes Henri Moucadel. Montfaucon : A l'asard Bautezar !, 2014, 448 p.

Editions in collection with other authors

In the second part of the 19th century Saboly's were often published with those of Antoine Peyrol (18th century) and Joseph Roumanille (1818-1891). 
These many editions reflect the literary movement of the Félibriges. The list below is not exhaustive.

 Li nouvè de Saboly, Peyrol, Roumanille em'un peçu d'aquéli de l'abat Lambert em'uno mescladisso de nouvè vièi e nóu e de vers de J. Reboul. Edicioun revisto e adoubado pèr lou felibre de la Miougrano emé la bono ajudo dóu felibre de Bello-visto. Avignon : Aubanel, 1858. 18°, 228 p. 
 Li Nouvè de Saboly e de Roumanille. Em’un bon noumbre de viei Nouvè que soun esta jamai empremi. Edicioun nouvello, revisto coume se dèu. Avignon : Joseph Roumanille, 1865 (impr. adm. Gros frères). 8°, VIII-160 p. Online on Gallica.
 Li nouvè de Saboly, de Peyrol e de J. Roumanille. Em'un bon noumbre de vièi Nouvè que se canton en Prouvènço. Edicioum nouvello, revisto coume se dèu. Avignon : Joseph Roumanille, 1879. 12°, viii-163 p.
 Li Nouvè de Micoulau Saboly e di Felibre... em'uno charradisso pèr Frederi Mistral. Avignon : Aubanel, 1869. 12°, 182 p.
 Li nouvè de Saboly, de Peyrol e de J. Roumanille... Avignon : Joseph Roumanille, 1873. 12°, 129 p.
 Li nouvè de Saboly, de Peyrol e de J. Roumanille... Em'un bon noumbre de vièi Nouvè que se canton en Prouvènço. Avignon : Joseph Roumanille, 1879. 12°, VIII-163 p. Online on Gallica.
 Li nouvè de Saboly de Peyrol e de J. Roumanille... IVe editcioun. - Avignon : Joseph Roumanille, 1887. 8°, 164 p.

List of carols 

Saboly did not compose all the Christmas carols that were attributed to him. 
They were originally published without music because they were sung to popular tunes that everyone knew by heart.
Saboly simply gave a note like "on the air of the echo", "on the air of the pastouro" or sometimes "On an air by Saboly".

The Provencal Documentation Center has retained in its booklet devoted to this author a list of 48 carols definitely composed by Saboly.

Following are the carols are according to the François Seguin edition of 1856:

First book (1667)

1. Iéu ai vist lou Piemount [original melody, 1660]
2. Bon Diéu! la grand clarta [original melody]
3. Micoulau noste pastre [melody: Nicolas va voir Jeanne]
4. Ai! quouro tournara lou tèms [melody: Quand reviendra-t-il le temps]
5. Li a proun de gènt que van en roumavage [melody: Toulerontonton]
6. Un pau après lei tempouro [melody: L'autre jour, dans sa colère]
7. Ça menen rejouissènço [melody: Quand vous serez]
8. Viven urous e countènt [melody: Vivons heureux et contents]
9. Per noun langui long dou camin [melody: Allant au marché ce matin]
10. Ai! la bono fourtuno [melody: Montalay n'est pas fière]
11. Pièisque l'ourguei de l'umano naturo [original melody]
12. Venès lèu vèire la pièucello [melody: Qu'ils sont doux, bouteille jolie (air de Lully pour le Malade imaginaire)]

Second book (1668)

13. Ai proun couneigu [melody: Pargai puisqu'enfin]
14. Chut! teisas-vous [air de l'Echo, également connu sous le nom de Tarare-Pon-pon]
15. Ourguhious plen de magagno [melody: Tircis caressait Chimène]
16. Diéu vous gard', noste mèstre [melody: Ce n'est qu'un badinage]
17. Vers lou pourtau Sant-Laze [melody: Il faut pour Endremonde]
18. Helas! qu'noun aurié pieta [original melody]

Third book (1669)

19. Li a quaucarèn que m'a fa pòu [melody: On a beau faire des serments]
20. L'Ange qu'a pourta la nouvello [air d'un menuet]
21. Nàutre sian d'enfant de cor [air du Traquenard]
22. Tòni, Guihèn, Peiroun [melody: Tout mon plus grand plaisir]
23. Un bèu matin, veguère uno accouchado [melody: Tu me défends de publier ma flamme]
24. Cerqués plus dins un marrit establo [air de la Bohémienne]

Fourth book, titled "Story of the birth of Jesus Christ" (1670)

25. Dòu tèms de l'empèri rouman [melody: Berger, va-t-en à tes moutons]
26. Hòu! de l'oustau! mèstre, mestresso [original melody]
27. Lou queitivié d'aquéu marrit estable [melody: peut-on douter?]
28. Sus lou coutau [melody: Dis-moi, Grisel]
29. Lei pastourèu [melody: Dans ce beau jour]
30. Soun tres ome fort sage [melody: Je ne m'aperçois guère]
31. Lei Mage dins Jerusalèn [melody: Non, je ne vous dirai pas]
32. La fe coumando de crèire [original melody]

Fifth book (1671)

33. Lei plus sage - Dòu vesinage [melody: Est-on sage?]
34. Lei pastre fan fèsto [melody: Aimable jeunesse]
35. Sant Jòusè m'a dit [melody: Noste paure cat (Saboly?)]
36. Ben urouso la neissènço [melody: Toujours l'amour me tourmente)
37. Aque ange qu'es vengu [melody: Un jour le berger Tircis]
38. Despièi lou tèms [air de l'Opéra]
39. Se vàutrei sias countènt [melody: Vous dirai bèn soun noum]

Sixth book (1672)

40. Me siéu plega - E bèn amaga [air du Postillon]
41. Que disès, mei bon fraire [melody: Tout rit dans nos campagnes]
42. Jujas un pàu de quinto sorto [melody: C'est un plaisir dans le bel âge]
43. Uno estello [melody: La bouteille - Me réveille]
44. Quand la miejo-nue sounavo [melody: Iéu n'aviéu uno chambriero]
45. Un ange a fa la crido [original melody]

Seventh book (1673)

46. Pastre dei mountagno [air de la Pastouro]
47. Lorsque vous sarés malaut [melody: Si vous êtes amoureux]
48. Auprès d'aquel estable [melody: Tan matin sies levado]
49. Adam e sa coumpagno [melody: Amants, quittez vos chaînes]
50. Jèsu, vous sias tout fioc e flamo [melody: Siéu pas ama]
51. Pastre, pastresso [melody: Vàutrei, fiheto, qu'avès de galant]
52. Venès vèire dins l'estable [melody: Dans le fond de ce bocage]
53. Tu que cerques tei delice [sic] [melody: Amarante est jeune et belle]
54. Vesès eici moun Nouvelisto [unknown melody]

Eighth book (1674)

55. Proufitas-me lèu, bravo bregado [melody: Changerez-vous donc?]
56. Touro-louro-louro! lou gau canto [air de Bourgogne]
57. L'estrange deluge [melody: Malgré tant d'orages]
58. Vos-tu qu'anen en Betelèn [melody: Chambriero, te vos-tu louga?]
59. Qu'vòu faire grand journado [melody: Qu'on passe en douceur sa vie]
60. Segnour, n'es pas resounable [melody: Jeunes cœurs, laissez-vous prendre]
61. Per vèire la jacènt [melody: Se Jano me vòu mau]
62. Sortez d'ici, race maudite [original melody]

Additions in the 1704 edition

63. En sourtènt de l'estable [original melody]
64. Guihaume, Tòni, Pèire  [original melody]
65. A la ciéuta de Betelèn  [original melody]
66. Un ange dòu cèu es vengu [air dei Boudougno] (débute par "Veici lou gros serpènt" dans l'éd. de 1704)
67. Sus! campanié, revihas-vous [air d'un carillon (Saboly)]; également attribué à Louis Puech
68. Noun vous amusés en cansoun [unknown melody]

Unpublished carols from the Bastide collection

1. Fau que l'envejo me passe - De rire de tout moun sadou
2. Vous tourmentès plus lou cervèu
3. Desespièi l'aubo dòu jour - Iéu ause dire
4. Iéu siéu Toumas, mai sariéu redicule
5. La naturo e lou pecat - Soun pire que chin a cat
6. Viras, viras de carriero - Bèu soulèu

Fragments from the Bastide collection

7. Sian eici dous enfant de cor
8. Bourtoumiéu, me vos-tu crèire?
9. Enfin Diéu es vengu
10. Se li a quaucun doute
11. Bonjour, bonjour, bello bregado
12. Un maset plen d'aragnado
13. Quinto bugado - Avié fa noste paire Adam

Other carols often attributed to Saboly (partial list)

 À la ciéuta de Betelèn
 Adam qu'ères urous
 Aquel ange qu'es vengu
 Bèn urouso la neissènço
 Bergié qu'abitas dins la plano
 De bon matin pèr la campagno
 De matin ai rescountra lou trin (Domergue) 
 Frustèu, esfato ti roupiho
 Iéu, ai moun fifre
 La vèio de Nouvè (Peyrol) 
 Revèio-te, Nanan (Bruel) 
 Nàutrei sian tres bòumian (Puech) 
 Qu'aquéu jour es urous
 Un ange a crida (Peyrol)

Famous carols
  
 La marche des Rois (attributed to Saboly, but certainly by Joseph-François Domergue)
 La Cambo me fai mau
 La Coupo Santo: the carol composed on Guihaume, Tòni, Pèire was used with a slight rhythmic variation and words by Frédéric Mistral to make the Coupo Santo, the Provençal anthem.

Opinions about Nicolas Saboly and his work

Notes

Citations

Sources

 
 

1614 births
1675 deaths
17th-century male writers
Occitan-language writers
17th-century French poets
French male composers
Christmas carols
Christmas in France